Mouth music may refer to:

 Puirt a beul, a Scottish traditional music style
 Mouth Music (band), a band who sings in that style